Ellen Ullman is an American computer programmer and author.  She has written books, articles, and essays that  analyze the human side of the world of computer programming.

She has owned a consulting firm and worked as technology commentator for NPR's All Things Considered.  Her breakthrough book was non-fiction: Close to the Machine: Technophilia and its Discontents.

Life 
Ullman's adoptive father's family included computer scientists and mathematicians who had a major impact on her decision to pursue software engineering, a field for which she did "not have native talent." Ullman earned a B.A. in English at Cornell University in the early 1970s. She began working professionally in 1978 as a programmer of electronic data interchange applications and graphical user interfaces.

She eventually began writing about her experiences as a programmer. From 1994 until 1996, she published articles in Harper's Magazine and in the collections Resisting the Virtual Life and Wired Women. She lives in San Francisco.

Bibliography

Books
 Close to the Machine: Technophilia and its Discontents San Francisco : City Lights Books, 1997.   
 Life in Code: A Personal History of Technology New York: MCD, Farrar, Straus and Giroux, 2017.

Novels
 The Bug New York, N.Y. : Talese, 2003.  
 By Blood: A Novel New York, N.Y. :  Farrar, Straus and Giroux, 2012.

Selected articles and essays
 Out of Time: Reflections on the Programming Life (included in the 1995 collection Resisting the Virtual Life)
 The Myth of Order. The real lesson of Y2K is that software operates just like any natural system: out of control 
 The dumbing-down of programming 
 How to Be a 'Woman Programmer''' 
 Twilight of the crypto-geeks: Lone-wolf digital libertarians are beginning to abandon their faith in technology uber alles and espouse suspiciously socialist-sounding ideas. 
 Geeks Win: A survey of the oddballs who write the codes that make the 21st-century world go round 
 The Orphans of Invention 
 The Boss in the Machine 
 Identity Stolen? Take a Number 
 Dennis Ritchie''

References

External links

 Interview with Salon magazine (October 9, 1997)
 Interview with Stay Free magazine (Fall 1998)
 Interview with frontwheeldrive.com (May 21, 1999)
 Interview with SF Gate (May 8, 2002)
 Interview and discussion of The Bug on The WELL (January, 2004)
 Audio interview with Jon Udell (October 6, 2006)

Year of birth missing (living people)
Living people
Writers from California
Cornell University alumni
American women computer scientists
American computer scientists
21st-century American women